The Mount Airy Mantle and Table Company was founded  in 1902 by George O. Graves, G.H. Williamson and Calvin Graves, Sr. in Mount Airy, North Carolina.

It merged with the National Furniture Company and was eventually purchased by Bassett Furniture.

References

Furniture companies of the United States
Manufacturing companies based in North Carolina
Surry County, North Carolina
Manufacturing companies established in 1902
1902 establishments in North Carolina